Play Straight or Fight is a 1918 American short silent Western film directed by Paul Hurst.

Cast
 Hoot Gibson
 Helen Gibson
 Millard K. Wilson
 G. Raymond Nye
 Noble Johnson

Reception
Like many American films of the time, Play Straight or Fight was subject to restrictions and cuts by city and state film censorship boards. For example, the Chicago Board of Censors cut, in Reel 1, shooting the man through the door, and, Reel 2, bandits shooting at stage and man falling from coach.

See also
 Hoot Gibson filmography

References

External links
 

1918 films
1918 short films
1918 Western (genre) films
American silent short films
American black-and-white films
Silent American Western (genre) films
Films directed by Paul Hurst
1910s American films